Rhombodera javana is a species of praying mantises in the family Mantidae, found in China and the island of Java in Indonesia.

See also
List of mantis genera and species
Mantodea of Asia

References

J
Mantodea of Asia
Insects of Indonesia
Fauna of Java
Insects described in 1912